Vandenberg Space Force Base Launch Facility 21 (LF-21) is a former US Air Force Intercontinental ballistic missile launch facility on Vandenberg SFB, California, USA.  It was a launch site for the land-based Minuteman missile series.  In the 2000s the silo was remodeled into a launch site for an Interceptor for the Ground-Based Midcourse Defense System.

See also
Vandenberg AFB Launch Facility 02

Vandenberg AFB Launch Facility 03

References

Vandenberg Space Force Base